Shorea mecistopteryx is a tree in the family Dipterocarpaceae, native to Borneo. The specific epithet mecistopteryx means "big wing", referring to the fruit's lobes.

Description
The smooth bark later becomes flaking and cracked.

Distribution and habitat
Shorea mecistopteryx is endemic to Borneo.

Conservation
Shorea mecistopteryx has been assessed as vulnerable on the IUCN Red List. It is threatened by conversion of land for agriculture, mainly for palm oil plantations. The species is also threatened by logging for its timber and the construction of logging roads. In Kalimantan, forest fires are a risk for the species. Shorea mecistopteryx does occur in a number of protected areas.

References

mecistopteryx
Endemic flora of Borneo
Plants described in 1925
Taxa named by Henry Nicholas Ridley